The Calamba–Pagsanjan Road, officially known as Calamba–Sta. Cruz–Famy Junction Road and National Highway, is a two-to-four lane primary highway located in the province of Laguna in the Philippines.

The entire road is designated as National Route 66 (N66), a national primary route of the Philippine highway network.

Route description

It starts from the intersection of the Old National Highway (Manila South Road) and J.P. Rizal Street (Rizal Shrine Road) at the Calamba Crossing in Calamba. It will then follow a route that circumscribes Laguna de Bay, passing through the municipalities of Los Baños, Bay, Calauan, Victoria, Pila, Santa Cruz, the capital of Laguna, and terminates in Pagsanjan, all in Laguna.

Alternative names
The highway is also known as National Highway for being such. It forms part of the Calamba to Pagsanjan segment of the Calamba–Sta. Cruz–Famy Junction Road. Its section in Calauan and Victoria is also known as Masapang Highway (misspelled or also known as Maspang Highway), apparently after the barangay of the same name in Victoria where its eastern end is located. At the town proper of Pagsanjan, it is locally known as J.P. Rizal Street or simply as Rizal Street.

History
Most of the highway existed back to the American colonial era as part of Highway 21 that linked the city of Manila to the provinces of Rizal and Laguna by circumscribing Laguna de Bay. Roads bypassing the poblacions of Santa Cruz, Calauan, and Bay were later built to form the present-day highway.

Intersections

References

Roads in Laguna (province)
Laguna de Bay